Abdi Isak (born 1 January 1966) is a marathon runner who competed internationally for Somalia.

Adani competed at the 1996 Summer Olympics in Atlanta, he competed in the marathon finishing in 110th position.

References

External links
 

1966 births
Living people
Olympic athletes of Somalia
Athletes (track and field) at the 1996 Summer Olympics
Somalian male marathon runners
Somalian sportsmen